Yoast SEO is a search engine optimization (SEO) plug-in for WordPress. This plugin has over 5 million active installations and has been downloaded more than 350 million times with over 25,000 five star reviews on Wordpress.org.

History 
Yoast SEO created its first WordPress SEO plugin in 2007 - originally named WordPress SEO: it was developed as a WordPress plugin by SEO consultant Joost de Valk. In 2012, the plug-in was renamed Yoast SEO. In 2012, a premium version of the plug-in was launched. In 2015, Yoast hosted the first YoastCon conference, which was hosted at the Lindenberg Nijmegen Culture House in Nijmegen, Netherlands. In 2015 a flaw was discovered in version 1.7.3.3 and earlier versions. The flaw could have left users of Yoast SEO open to hackers and was discovered by a security consultant.

In 2018, Yoast had a total turnover of €10 million.

Company 
Yoast SEO can trace its origins to 2005 when Joost de Valk launched a website named "joostdevalk.nl". After moving to and eventually selling the domain "css3.info", de Valk created the Yoast platform in 2009, launched the first version of WordPress SEO in 2010 and founded the company Yoast BV in 2010.

Initially, Yoast focused on SEO consultancy and developed both the Yoast SEO plugin and a Google Analytics plugin, both for WordPress. In 2012, a premium version of Yoast SEO was launched. In April 2016, Yoast BV sold the Google Analytics for WordPress plugin.

According to Yoast, as of September 2018, they have almost 100 employees, of which 85 are based in their HQ in Wijchen, Netherlands.

Reception 
The software runs on more than 11 million sites and on 15.4% of the top 1 million sites in the world. On WordPress alone, it has amassed over five million downloads. Michael David, the author of WordPress Search Engine Optimization (2015) book, referred to it as "the granddaddy of all SEO plugins". Brian Santo, editor of EE Times, uses Yoast for estimating the ranking of articles on Google by using analysis results (e.g. keyphrase, keyword density, links, readability), but criticizes the negative effects SEO has had on journalism and suggest Google use more human or artificial intelligence to improve search.

Sponsorship
In September 2020, Yoast announced it became the main sponsor of a professional basketball club Yoast United, which plays in the BNXT League.

See also 
 Automattic
 Akismet

References

Further reading

Search engine optimization
2010 software
Blog software
Content management systems
PHP software
Website management